Events in the year 1930 in Portugal.

Incumbents
President: Óscar Carmona
Prime Minister: Artur Ivens Ferraz (until 21 January); Domingos Oliveira

Events
21 January – Domingos Oliveira becomes Prime Minister
The Technical University of Lisbon established

Arts and entertainment
Lisbon Book Fair first held

Sports
C.D. Aves founded
GD Joane founded
C.D. Trofense founded

Births

1 January – Mário Quina, sailor.
18 January – Maria de Lourdes Pintasilgo, chemical engineer and politician (died in 2004)

Deaths

 December 8 – Florbela Espanca, Portuguese poet (b. 1894)

References

 
1930s in Portugal
Portugal
Years of the 20th century in Portugal
Portugal